The Aberdare cisticola (Cisticola aberdare) is a species of bird in the family Cisticolidae. It is endemic to Kenya.

Its natural habitat is subtropical or tropical high-altitude grassland.
It is threatened by habitat loss.

Description 
It is a large and stocky cisticola with a heavy bill, plain face, boldly striped upperparts, and a medium-long graduated tail. Its voice is a mixture of peeuu tew tew and other short trills.

Diet 
It feeds on beetles and flies, foraging for them by searching through vegetation and on the ground.

Behavior 
The Aberdare cisticola is believed to be monogamous, solitary and territorial. It breeds from January through May and August through November, building a nest out of a flimsy ball of branches and leaves.

References

Cisticola
Endemic birds of Kenya
Birds described in 1930
Taxonomy articles created by Polbot